Balázs Sarus (born 9 December 1988 in Győr) is a Hungarian football player who currently plays for Kecskeméti TE.

References 
Győri ETO FC Official website
HLSZ

1988 births
Living people
Sportspeople from Győr
Hungarian footballers
Association football midfielders
Győri ETO FC players
Gyirmót FC Győr players
Integrál-DAC footballers
Lombard-Pápa TFC footballers
Nyíregyháza Spartacus FC players
Balmazújvárosi FC players